3-Chlorobenzonitrile is an organic compound with the chemical formula ClC6H4CN. It is one of the isomers of chlorobenzonitrile.

Preparation and reactions
Typically, aryl nitriles are produced by ammoxidation.
3-Chlorobenzonitrile can also be produced by dehydration of the aldoxime of 3-chlorobenzaldehyde. It can also produced by heating 3-chlorobenzylamine and iodine in ammonium acetate aqueous solution.

In the presence of copper nanoparticles, 3-chlorobenzonitrile can be reduced by sodium borohydride to 3-chlorobenzylamine. Some ruthenium catalyzers can catalysis the hydrolysis of 3-chlorobenzonitrile to form 3-chlorobenzamide.

References

Chlorobenzenes
Benzonitriles